The Toprakkale–Iskendurun railway is a  long electrified railway in southern Turkey. The railway branches off the Adana–Nusaybin railway at Toprakkale and heads south along the northeastern coast of the Mediterranean in the province Hatay. The line is an important freight route and the southernmost railway on the eastern iron-ore rail corridor. The line services the Port of İskendurun as well as the İsdemir steel mill. Primary traffic along the railway are freight trains carrying iron ore from the mines near Divriği, in northern Turkey. The line was opened on 1 November 1912 by the Baghdad Railway. Today, the line is owned and operated by the Turkish State Railways.

Railway lines opened in 1912
Railway lines in Turkey